Ma Fleur ("my flower" in French) is the fourth full-length release and third proper studio album by The Cinematic Orchestra, released on 7 May 2007.  The North American version of the album contains 10 tracks in a different sequence from the UK version and omits "Child Song". The song "To Build a Home" was used in an award-winning 2008 Schweppes Lemonade advertisement called "Burst" and in the 2010 Australian-French film The Tree, and the similar shorter song "That Home" in the trailer for 2011 film Another Earth.

Track listing

UK release
CD
"To Build a Home" – 6:11 (with Patrick Watson)
"Familiar Ground" – 4:34 (with Fontella Bass)
"Child Song" – 5:14
"Music Box" – 5:03 (with Patrick Watson and Lou Rhodes)
"Prelude" – 2:43
"As the Stars Fall" – 5:55
"Into You" – 3:02 (with Patrick Watson)
"Ma Fleur" – 4:32
"Breathe" – 6:33 (with Fontella Bass) 
"That Home" – 1:43 (with Patrick Watson)
"Time and Space" – 8:42 (with Lou Rhodes)

Vinyl
Side A
1. "To Build a Home"
2. "Familiar Ground"
3. "That Home"
Side B
4. "Child Song"
5. "Music Box"
6. "Ma Fleur"
Side C
7. "Prelude"
8. "As the Stars Fall"
9. "Into You"
Side D
10. "Breathe"
11. "Time and Space"

US release (Domino)
 "That Home"
 "Familiar Ground"
 "Ma Fleur"
 "Music Box"
 "Time and Space"
 "Prelude"
 "As the Stars Fall"
 "Into You"
 "Breathe"
 "To Build a Home"

Certifications

References

External links
Cinematic Orchestra official website
Ninja Tune official website

2007 albums
Domino Recording Company albums
Ninja Tune albums
The Cinematic Orchestra albums